Kristiansand International Children's Film Festival is an organised, extended presentation of international children's films in one or more movie theaters or screening venues, usually in a single locality. It is located in Kristiansand, Norway.

Selected releases
 The Sword in the Stone (May 3, 2000)
 The Great Mouse Detective (May 3, 2000)
 The Jungle Book (May 4, 2000)
 Winnie the Pooh and Tigger Too! (May 4, 2000)
 Fantasia 2000 (May 4, 2000)
 The Aristocats (May 2, 2001)
 Lady and the Tramp II: Scamp's Adventure (May 3, 2001)
 Lady and the Tramp (April 30, 2002)
 Snow White and the Seven Dwarfs (May 1, 2002)
 Dumbo (May 1, 2002)
 One Hundred and One Dalmatians (May 1, 2002)
 Pippi on the Run (May 1, 2002)
 Tom and Jerry: The Magic Ring (May 1, 2002)
 Alice in Wonderland (May 4, 2002)
 Don't Cry Wolf (April 29, 2003)
 Pippi in the South Seas (April 29, 2003)
 Hercules (May 3, 2003)
 Looney Tunes: Back in Action (April 27, 2004)
 Winnie the Pooh: Springtime with Roo (April 29, 2004)
 The Cat Came Back (April 30, 2004)

References

External links

Culture in Agder
Film festivals in Norway
Mass media in Norway
Children's film festivals
Tourist attractions in Agder
Kristiansand